Glen Adams (born 16 February 1995) is a South African cricketer. He made his Twenty20 debut for Mpumalanga in the 2018 Africa T20 Cup on 14 September 2018. He made his List A debut on 23 March 2021, for North West in the 2020–21 CSA Provincial One-Day Challenge. In April 2021, he was named in Mpumalanga's squad, ahead of the 2021–22 cricket season in South Africa.

References

External links
 

1995 births
Living people
South African cricketers
Mpumalanga cricketers
North West cricketers
Place of birth missing (living people)